Al-Khamis is a sub-district located in Arhab District, Sana'a Governorate, Yemen. Al-Khamis had a population of 7314 according to the 2004 census.

References 

Sub-districts in Arhab District